"455 Rocket" is a song written by Gillian Welch and David Rawlings, and recorded by American country music artist Kathy Mattea. It was released in January 1997 as the first single from the album Love Travels. The song reached number 21 on the Billboard Hot Country Singles & Tracks chart.

Content
The song is about a woman who buys a used Oldsmobile with a powerful 455 V8 engine. Despite its flaws, which include a leaky roof and excessive noise, she enjoys racing and winning against local car enthusiasts. During one race, though, she skids on a curve and crashes through a guardrail; although she is unhurt, the car is badly damaged and has to be towed away.

Mattea noted of the song that the band recorded several takes, but decided to keep the first one because "no one thought they were being recorded, and everyone was just playing with abandon." She also noted that due to the nature of the recording, session musician Jim Keltner can be heard dropping his drumsticks at the end of the song and laughing.

Personnel
From Love Travels liner notes.

 Pat Buchanan - electric guitar
 Jerry Douglas - Dobro
 Stuart Duncan - mandolin
 Bob Halligan Jr. - background vocals
 Hutch Hutchinson - bass guitar, foot taps, knee slaps
 Kirk "Jelly Roll" Johnson - harmonica
 Jim Keltner - drums, maracas, foot taps, knee slaps
 Kathy Mattea - vocals, foot taps, knee slaps
 Don Potter - acoustic guitar
 Kim Richey - background vocals

Chart performance

References

1997 singles
Kathy Mattea songs
Mercury Nashville singles
1997 songs
Songs written by David Rawlings
Songs written by Gillian Welch
Songs about cars